Hot Crossover 30 was a weekly record chart published by American magazine Billboard that ranked the 30 top-performing songs on "crossover" radio stations in the United States featuring a combination of Black, dance, and pop music. It was first published in the February 28, 1987, issue of Billboard. The chart was renamed Top 40/Dance on September 9, 1989, and last published on December 1, 1990. Unlike the guitar-oriented rock music heard on contemporary hit radio stations at the time, songs that appeared on the Hot Crossover 30 were often typified by their up-tempo nature, featured drum machines and electronic keyboards, and had varied dance, pop, and R&B influences. Club Nouveau's "Lean on Me" was the first of 65 different songs that topped the chart, and Mariah Carey's "Love Takes Time" was the last.

To formulate the chart, Billboard created a panel of crossover radio stations which reported their current playlists by rank every week. The magazine converted these ranks to points using a weighting system based on the station's Arbitron rating. The most-played song on a station received a base of 25 points while songs ranked below number 40 received 5 points. The points were multiplied 0.5 times if it was played by a station with a weekly cumulative audience of under 100,000 people, 1 time if the station had an audience between 100,000 and 249,999, 1.5 times if the station had an audience between 250,000 and 499,999, 2 times if the station had an audience between 500,000 to 999,999, and 2.5 times if the station had an audience over 1 million. Songs were eligible to chart regardless of a commercial release, as long as they received a combined 175 points from at least 10 stations.

Hot Crossover 30 allowed programmers at burgeoning crossover stations to observe the national popularity of songs on similar stations, some of which had been previously unrecognized because such stations did not contribute to any other Billboard chart. The Hot Crossover 30 panel of stations originally included those that reported exclusively to the chart and some that also reported to either the Hot 100 or Hot Black Singles charts. Effective September 9, 1989, stations formerly exclusive to the Hot Crossover 30 panel also contributed to the Hot 100. By the chart's last issue on December 1, 1990, Billboard considered its composition of songs too similar to the Hot 100's and announced its discontinuation. The Black/dance/pop crossover genre became known as rhythmic contemporary, and Billboard launched the Top 40/Rhythm-Crossover chart on October 3, 1992.

Chart history

References

Billboard charts
Crossover